The 1985 NCAA men's volleyball tournament was the 16th annual tournament to determine the national champion of NCAA men's collegiate volleyball. The tournament was played at Pauley Pavilion in Los Angeles, California during May 1985.

Pepperdine defeated USC in the final match, 3–1 (10–15, 15–10, 15–7, 15–3), to win their second national title. The Waves (25–2) were coached by Marv Dunphy.

Pepperdines's Bob Ctvrtlik was named the tournament's Most Outstanding Player. Ctvrtlik, along with six other players, comprised the All-tournament team.

Qualification
Until the creation of the NCAA Men's Division III Volleyball Championship in 2012, there was only a single national championship for men's volleyball. As such, all NCAA men's volleyball programs whether from Division I, Division II, or Division III, were eligible. A total of 4 teams were invited to contest this championship.

Tournament bracket 
Site: Pauley Pavilion, Los Angeles, California

All tournament team 
Bob Ctvrtlik, Pepperdine (Most outstanding player)
Bill Yardley, USC
Rudy Dvorak, USC
Chao Ying Zhang, USC
Troy Tanner, Pepperdine
Matt Rigg, Pepperdine
Mike Fitzgerald, Pepperdine

See also 
 NCAA Men's National Collegiate Volleyball Championship
 NCAA Division I Women's Volleyball Championship

References

1985
NCAA Men's Volleyball Championship
NCAA Men's Volleyball Championship
1985 in sports in California
May 1985 sports events in the United States
Volleyball in California